The Dybbuk (Der Dibuk) is a 1937 Yiddish-language Polish fantasy drama directed by Michał Waszyński. It is based on the play The Dybbuk by S. Ansky.

The Dybbuk, or Between Two Worlds (Der Dibuk, oder Tsvishn Tsvey Veltn) is a 1914 play by S. Ansky, relating the story of a young bride possessed by a dybbuk – a malicious possessing spirit, believed to be the dislocated soul of a dead person – on the eve of her wedding. The Dybbuk is considered a seminal play in the history of Jewish theatre, and played an important role in the development of Yiddish theatre and theatre in Israel. The play was based on years of research by Ansky, who traveled between Jewish shtetls in Russia and Ukraine, documenting folk beliefs and stories of the Hassidic Jews.

The film adds an additional act before those in the original play: it shows the close friendship of Sender and Nisn as young men. Besides the language of the film itself, the picture is noted among film historians for the striking scene of Leah's wedding, which is shot in the style of German Expressionism. The film is generally considered one of the finest in the Yiddish language. The Dybbuk was filmed on location in Kazimierz Dolny, Poland, and in Feniks Film Studio in Warsaw.

Plot
Two best friends, Nisan and Sender, living in a shtetl in the Pale of Settlement, jointly vow that the children their wives are expecting will eventually marry, against the advice of a mysterious and sinister traveller who warns against binding future generations. Sender's wife dies giving birth to their daughter Leah, and Nisan drowns in a storm at the moment his wife gives birth to their son Chanan. Sender becomes a rich but miserly rabbi in the shtetl of Britnitz, and one day Chanan arrives there as a poor yeshiva student. With both men unaware of their connection, Sender offers Chanan hospitality. Leah and Chanan fall in love, but knowing that Sender will not agree to marriage because of his lack of wealth, Chanan obsessively studies the Kabbalah and attempts to practice magic to improve his position. When he hears that Sender has arranged Leah's marriage to a rich man's son, he calls on Satan to help him. He's struck dead, but returns as a dybbuk, a restless spirit, who possesses Leah. The ceremony is postponed, and Sender calls on the assistance of Ezeriel, a wise and powerful rabbi in nearby Miropol (Myropil). Ezeriel exorcises the dybbuk, but Leah offers her soul to Chanan and dies as the mysterious stranger blows out a candle.

Cast
 as Rabbi Ezeriel ben Hodos
 as Meszulach, the messenger
 as Sender Brynicer ben Henie
 as Leah – Sender's daughter
Leon Liebgold as Chanan ben Nisan
Dina Halpern as Aunt Frade
 (billed: Maks Bozyk) as Nute, Sender's friend
M. Messinger as Menasze, the prospective groom
 as Nisan ben Rifke
Samuel Bronecki (billed: S. Bronecki) as Nachman, Menasze's father
 as Zalman, matchmaker
 as Michael
Judith Berg as Dancer

 as Mendel

See also
Yiddish cinema
Cinema of Poland

References

External links 
 
 

1930s fantasy drama films
1937 films
Polish black-and-white films
Films about Orthodox and Hasidic Jews
Dybbuks in film
Films directed by Michał Waszyński
Yiddish-language films
Yiddish-language mass media in Poland
Polish fantasy drama films
1937 drama films